Wilshire is an English surname. Notable people with the surname include:

 Brian Wilshire, Australian talk radio host
 Bruce Wilshire, American philosopher and professor at Rutgers University
 David Wilshire, British politician and Parliament member
 Henry Austin Wilshire, Australian architect
 Henry Gaylord Wilshire, American land developer, namesake of Wilshire Boulevard in Los Angeles, California
 Jack Wilshire, English footballer
 Mary Wilshire, American comics artist
 William Wallace Wilshire, American politician